/Film, also spelled Slashfilm, is a blog that covers movie news, reviews, interviews, and trailers. It was founded by Peter Sciretta in August 2005.

Podcasts
Six podcasts have run on the site. The /Filmcast, hosted by David Chen, Devindra Hardawar, and Jeff Cannata airs weekly and focuses on a discussion of a recently released film, along with current film news and other related entertainment topics (Adam Quigley co-hosted the show with Chen and Hardawar from 2008 to 2013). In July 2021, the show became independent from the site and was rebranded The Filmcast. The Tobolowsky Files, hosted by Chen, features character actor Stephen Tobolowsky talking about his career, life and other topics. The JustifiedCast, also hosted by Chen, followed season 3 of the TV series Justified. A Cast of Kings is a podcast hosted by Chen and Joanna Robinson of Vanityfair.com in which they discuss and analyze each episode of Game of Thrones. The Ones Who Knock is Chen and Robinson's other podcast, where they dissect each episode of Breaking Bad. /Film Daily is hosted by Peter Sciretta and a rotating cast of /Film writers, where they discuss the days movie news.

Awards and nominations
 /Film won Total Film Movie Blog Award in the Majors category.
 Time magazine named /Film one of the 25 Best Blogs of 2009.
 G4's Attack of the Show! listed it as one of the Best Movie Blogs.
 PCMag listed the site in its Best Web Sites for Movie Fans.
 /Film won the Performancing Blog Award for "Best Entertainment Blog of 2007."
 The site was nominated for, and was a finalist for, Best Major Blog for the 2008 Weblog Awards.
 It was nominated for "Best Entertainment Weblog" in the 2008 Bloggies.

References

External links
 

American film websites
Internet properties established in 2005
2005 establishments in the United States
Film websites
American blogs
American entertainment websites
Film and television podcasts